Luv is a British television sitcom made by the BBC in 1993 which ran for 18 episodes. The writer and executive producer was Carla Lane. The main characters, Terese and Harold Craven, were played by Sue Johnston and Michael Angelis.

External links

BBC television sitcoms
1993 British television series debuts
1994 British television series endings
1990s British sitcoms
English-language television shows